Nahanni may refer to:
 Nahanni National Park Reserve, in the Northwest Territories, Canada
 Nahanni Butte, in the Northwest Territories, Canada
 Nahanni Butte Airport, that serves the community
 Nahanni Butte Water Aerodrome, a former water aerodrome that served the community
 South Nahanni River, that flows through the park
 North Nahanni River, a tributary of the Mackenzie River in the Northwest Territories
 Nahanni Formation, a stratigraphical unit of Givetian age in the Western Canadian Sedimentary Basin
 1985 Nahanni earthquakes, a continuous sequence of earthquakes that began in 1985 in the Nahanni region
 Nahani, an Athapaskan word used to designate native groups located in British Columbia, the Northwest Territories and Yukon
 Nahanni Range Road, Yukon Highway 10, mainly in Yukon but a portion in the Northwest Territories
 North-Wright Airways, formerly known as Nahanni Air Services
 Nahanni (film), a 1962 short documentary